Heshmatollah Mohajerani (born 13 December 1939) is a retired Iranian association football midfielder and manager.

Early life and playing career 
Mohajerani was born to Asadoolah Mohajerani and Leila Nassiri in a family of six siblings. After years, his family moved to Tehran and his older brothers began playing football in Taj's youth teams. At the age of 20, Mohajerani also joined Taj SC (now known as Esteghlal) and retired after the 1969 World Military Cup held in Greece.

Personal life 

Mohajerani married Zari Sheikhan in 1969.

Managerial statistics

Honours

Playing honours 
Taj
Tehran Football League: 1960, 1962, 1964, Runner-up 1959
Tehran Hazfi Cup: 1959

Managerial honours 
Iran U-20
Asian Youth Championship: 1973, 1974, 1975, 1976

Iran
AFC Asian Cup: 1976
Summer Olympic Games: Quarter-final 1976
FIFA World Cup Qualification: 1978

Al-Shaab
UAE President's Cup: Runner-up 1979–80

UAE
Gulf Cup of Nations: Third-place 1982

Al-Wahda
UAE Union Cup: 1985

Al-Ahli
Emir of Qatar Cup: Runner-up 1997–98
Sheikh Jassem Cup: Runner-up 1998–99

References 

1936 births
Living people
Sportspeople from Mashhad
Iranian footballers
Esteghlal F.C. players
Iran national football team managers
Iranian football managers
Iranian expatriate football managers
1978 FIFA World Cup managers
AFC Asian Cup-winning managers
1976 AFC Asian Cup managers
1980 AFC Asian Cup managers
Association football midfielders
Al-Shaab CSC managers